Chadhaibhol (or Chadheibhol) is a village in Mayurbhanj district, Odisha state, India. It is a nearest village from Karanjia and Turumunga. It is located on NH 49 (now AH46) between Jashipur and Keonjhar. It is located 129 km towards west from District headquarters Baripada and 229 km from State capital Bhubaneswar.

According to the 2011 census of India, the total population of Chadheibhol is 1,538, of which 815 are male and 723 are female.

References

Villages in Mayurbhanj district